The  is a second-generation handheld game console released by Epoch Co. in Japan in 1984 for 12,800 Japanese yen. It is also known as Pokekon and was one of the very few truly handheld systems to be released in the early 1980s, preceding the Game Boy by 5 years.

The system was a commercial failure in Japan, and as a result, only 5 games were made for it. A puzzle game and a paint program were built into the system. It was powered by 4 AA batteries, and screen's contrast could be adjusted by the user. Input and output controls included four buttons, an 8-way joypad, a contrast dial, and a sound on-off switch.

Because the Game Pocket Computer failed in Japan, and was never released internationally, the device is extremely rare, and units on eBay can go for hundreds of US dollars.

Technical specifications 
LC display: monochrome, 75 × 64 pixels

Power supply: 4 AA batteries
Battery life: Not clear; >70 hours or 60 hours
CPU: NEC uPD78c06 clocked at 6 MHz
RAM: 2 KB
ROM (cartridges): 8 or 16 KB
Sound: 1 sound channel

Games
There were a total of 7 different games released for the system.

2 were built into the system. The  cartridge included with the system only serves as instructions and to occupy the cartridge slot, containing no game data, as it doesn't need to be inserted into the system to play the games;
, an 11 tile version of Fifteen puzzle.
, a Raster graphics editor paint program.
The other 5 were released separately for 2,980 Japanese yen each, excluding Pocket Computer Mahjong which was 3,800 yen;

See also
Barcode Battler, another handheld game console released by Epoch Co.

References

External links

Pictures and info about the Game Pocket Computer
Other handheld games made by Epoch
More pictures and info for the Game Pocket Computer

Handheld game consoles
Monochrome video game consoles
Products introduced in 1984